Pomio District is a district of East New Britain Province in Papua New Guinea. It is one of the four administrative districts that make up the province.

Languages
Papuan languages spoken in the district are Ata, Kol, and Sulka.

Austronesian languages spoken in the district are Lote, Mengen, Nakanai, and Tomoip.

See also
Districts of Papua New Guinea
Pomio Kivung

References

Districts of Papua New Guinea